Trần Đình Long (born 22 February 1961) is a Vietnamese businessman and billionaire. He is the chair of Hoa Phat Group Joint Stock Company (HPG). He is considered among the most successful businessmen in Vietnam's steel industry.

Biography
Trần Đình Long was born on 22 February 1961. He was born and raised in Hải Dương. He currently resides in Hai Bà Trưng District, Hanoi.

Long graduated from Vietnam's National Economics University with a bachelor's degree in economics in 1986.

Career 
Long became the Chairman of Hòa Phát group in 1996.

In March 2019, Long was listed in the real-time list of billionaires by Forbes magazine – with a fortune of 1 billion USD, making him the 1756th richest man in the world at that time.

In 2021, he was listed in Forbes' list of billionaires as the 1444th richest man in the world, and the 3rd richest man in Vietnam – after Phạm Nhật Vượng and Nguyễn Thị Phương Thảo.

Personal life
Long has a wife named Vũ Thị Hiền. The couple has two children, Trần Vũ Minh and Trần Huyền Linh.

See also
 Trần Bá Dương
 Nguyễn Đăng Quang

References

External links
 Trần Đình Long on Forbes

Vietnamese businesspeople
1961 births
Living people
Vietnamese billionaires
Vietnamese business executives
People from Hải Dương province